David John Nish (born 26 September 1947) is an English former footballer who played as a defender. Nish's £225,000 transfer from Leicester City to Derby County in 1972 broke the British transfer record.

Club
Nish began his career with Leicester City in 1966. In 1972, Derby County paid a record transfer fee of £225,000 for his contract. At Derby he was part of the team that won the First Division in 1975.

In 1979, Nish moved to the United States where he joined the Tulsa Roughnecks of the North American Soccer League. In 1980, he moved to the Seattle Sounders where he played three seasons (two outdoor and one indoor). He finished his American career with one indoor season with the San Jose Earthquakes.

After leaving the U.S., he returned to Leicestershire where he turned out for non-league side Shepshed Charterhouse.

International
Nish earned five caps for the England national team in 1973 and 1974.

Since retiring as a player in 1981, he has also worked with the academies of both Leicester and Derby.

Honours
Leicester City
1971 FA Charity Shield

Derby County
1974–75: Football League Division One Champion 
1975 FA Charity Shield

References

External links

  David Nish at SoccerBase Database
Player profile at EnglandStats.com
Player profile at FilbertStreet.net
Derby County profile
NASL stats

1947 births
Living people
Association football defenders
English footballers
England international footballers
England under-23 international footballers
Leicester City F.C. players
Derby County F.C. players
North American Soccer League (1968–1984) indoor players
North American Soccer League (1968–1984) players
Tulsa Roughnecks (1978–1984) players
San Jose Earthquakes (1974–1988) players
Seattle Sounders (1974–1983) players
Shepshed Dynamo F.C. players
English Football League players
English Football League representative players
Sportspeople from Burton upon Trent
English expatriate footballers
Expatriate soccer players in the United States
English expatriate sportspeople in the United States
Leicester City F.C. non-playing staff
Derby County F.C. non-playing staff
FA Cup Final players